R26 or R-26 may refer to:

Roads 
 R-26 regional road (Montenegro)
 R26 (South Africa)

Other uses 
 R-26 (missile), a Soviet intercontinental ballistic missile
 R26 (New York City Subway car)
 R-26 (salon), an artistic salon in Paris
 British Airship R.26, a training airship
 , a destroyer of the Royal Navy
 R26: Very toxic by inhalation, a risk phrase
 Renault R26, a Formula One racing car
 Rubik R-26 Góbé, a Hungarian training glider
 , a submarine of the United States Navy